Bhuban Gam is a  Indian politician from Bharatiya Janata party who was the member of Assam Legislative Assembly by re-election  from Majuli Constituency in 2022,when Sarbanananda Sanowal resigns.

References

3. Assam: BJP names Bhuban Gam as candidate for Majuli by-election Guwahati Times.

Living people
Year of birth missing (living people)
Place of birth missing (living people)
Bharatiya Janata Party politicians from Assam
Assam MLAs 2021–2026